The 2012 Dwars door Vlaanderen was the 67th edition of the Dwars door Vlaanderen cycle race and was held on 21 March 2012. The race started in Roeselare and finished in Waregem. The race was won by Niki Terpstra.

General classification

References

2012
2012 in road cycling
2012 in Belgian sport
March 2012 sports events in Europe